Sick of it may refer to:

 A phrase indicating depression and/or frustration and/or disgust
 "Sick of It" (song), 2013 song by 'Skillet'
 "Sick of It" (Michelle Williams song), a 2008 song by Michelle Williams
 "Sick of It" (song), a 2020 song by Vanic
 "Sick of It" (song), a 2009 song by 'Evans Blue' off their eponymous album Evans Blue (album)
 "Sick of It" (song), a 1989 song by 'The Primitives' off the album Pure (The Primitives album)
 Sick of It (TV series), 2018 UK TV show
 "Sick of It" (TV episode), a 2009 season 1 episode of Delocated; see List of Delocated episodes

See also

 
 "I'm Sick Of It" (질릴만도한데), a 2012 single by Bumzu